Péyi Guyane ('Land of Guiana') is a political party in French Guiana. It was founded in 2018. The party has 7 territorial advisers out of 55 in the Assembly of French Guiana.

References

Political parties in French Guiana
Socialism in French Guiana
Communist parties in France